Lieutenant-General Sir Lawrence Worthington Parsons  (23 March 1850 – 20 August 1923) was a British Army officer who became General Officer Commanding 6th Division.

Military career
Brought up in Parsonstown in King's County, the only son of Lawrence Parsons. He  was commissioned into the Royal Artillery in 1870. He served in the Second Boer War and took part in the Battle of Colenso, the Battle of Spion Kop and the Relief of Ladysmith. He was appointed Inspector General of Artillery in India in 1903, General Officer Commanding 8th Division in Ireland in 1906 and General Officer Commanding 6th Division also in Ireland in 1907 before retiring in 1909. He was recalled as General Officer Commanding 16th (Irish) Division in 1914 at the start of the First World War and retired again in 1916.

Family
In 1880, he married Florence Anna Graves, daughter of Dr. Robert Graves of Cloghan Castle, and had one daughter.

References

External links
 

 

|-
 

|-

1850 births
1923 deaths
Military personnel from County Offaly
British Army lieutenant generals
British Army generals of World War I
Royal Artillery officers
Knights Commander of the Order of the Bath
British Army personnel of the Second Boer War